Events in the year 2014 in the State of Palestine.

Incumbents
State of Palestine (UN observer non-member State)
Mahmoud Abbas (PLO), President, 8 May 2005-current
Rami Hamdallah, Prime Minister, 6 June 2013-current
Gaza Strip (Hamas administration unrecognized by the United Nations)
Ismail Haniyeh (Hamas), Prime Minister, 29 March 2006-current

Events

March 
 10 March - Death of Raed Zeiter takes place, with international attention given to the incident.

April 
 23 April – Signing of the Fatah–Hamas Gaza Agreement occurs, with elections to occur soon.

June 
 2 June – Palestinian unity government was formed.
 12 June – Three Israeli teenagers were kidnapped and killed in the West Bank.

July 
 1 July - Palestinian journalist and prisoners' rights advocate Bushra al-Tawil is arrested by Israeli authorities and put in administrative detention. 
 2 July - Murder of Mohammed Abu Khdeir, followed by days of rioting in Shu'fat (East Jerusalem).
 8 July - Operation Protective Edge begins, with the Israeli military sending soldiers into the Gaza Strip

See also

2014 in Israel
2014 in Egypt
Operation Protective Edge
Timeline of the Israeli–Palestinian conflict in 2014

References

 
State of Palestine
Years of the 21st century in the State of Palestine
2010s in the State of Palestine
State of Palestine